Syed Samsam Ali Shah Bukhari  (Urdu: سید صمصام علی شاہ بخاری) (born 20 April 1967) is a Pakistani politician and a former Member of the National Assembly of Pakistan from NA-145 (Okara-III) for the Pakistan Peoples Party Parliamentarians. He is from the village of Karmanwala, Okara District and resides in Lahore, Punjab.
He was a member of the Provincial Assembly of the Punjab from October 2018 till January 2023.
He had been Provincial Minister of Punjab for Information and Culture  from 6 March 2019 to 19 July 2019 after resignation of Fayyaz ul Hassan Chohan.
On 20 July 2020, he was appointed provincial minister of Punjab for Fisheries and Wildlife and stayed in that role until April 2022.

Education
Masters in English Literature, Government College University Lahore.

Career
Sumsam Ali Shah Bukhari was introduced into politics in 2002 by Late Syed Sajjad Haider Kirmani, 5 times MNA and District Nazim at the time. Syed Sajjad Haider Kirmani held Syed Sumsam Ali Shah's family in high regard and was very fond Syed Sumsam Ali Shah Bukhari. He treated him like a son. He graciously had him fight the election his own constituency. Syed Sajjad Haider Kirmani had served as minister several times, he was uncle of Syeda Jugnu Mohsin MPA. Under the guidance of Syed Sajjad Haider Sumsam Ali participated his first election as an independent candidate. In 2002 he lost to Syed Gulzar Sabtain (PML Q). The nature of this win was very questionable and there was no doubt that Sumsam's inexperience was used against him and the ballot was tampered with. Despite the loss he continued to work hard for the people of his district and was always popular due to his hard work and honest nature.

Sumsam Ali participated in the 2008 general Elections from PPPP ticket and this time he succeeded with a heavy margin from Syed Gulzar Sabtain. He was given the portfolio of Minister Of State for information due to his strong public relations. The Samsam's relations with Alnoor family from Rajowal are good. These relations played an important role behind his success in 2008 and 2018. He worked honestly and built a good political position for himself nationally. He was one of the few who have never been involved in or named for any corruption.

In 2013 he lost the general to Syed Aashiq Hussain Kirmani (PML N). PML N won in Punjab heavily this year and PPPP suffered many heavy blows.

He joined Imran Khan's Tehreek e Insaaf in July 2015 with Ashraf Sohna. The Okara district is a PML N stronghold. Sumsam Ali's former rival Gulzar Sabtain also joined hands with him in the early months 2018 and continue to work together. Inter party politics led to Sumsam losing his closest ally, Ashraf Sohna just before the election, it was a huge personal and political blow. The independents spent a lot of money to buy the public which led to the vote in the constituency getting divided in the favour of the PML N. Neither PTI nor strong independent candidates were able to win due to lack of unity. Syed Sumsam Ali along with the whole of the Okara district and many seasoned politicians, lost the 2018 general elections to the PML N.

The party was kind enough to recognise the difficult position they had put him in and with the heavy support of the local party workers, gave him the ticket for MPA from Sahiwal for the 2018 by-election. Sumsam Ali won in October 2018 and is currently serving as a MPA (PTI) from Punjab. Due to his honesty, capability and flair for politics he continues to work in close proximity to the party centre especially with the Chief Minister of Punjab, Usman Buzdar and the Governor of Punjab Chaudhry Sarwar. They played a very important role behind his success in general election 2018.

Personal life
He has traveled to over 100 countries. His hobbies include reading, farming and hunting. He is married with a son and two daughters.

References

External links
 
 Syed Samsam Bukhari/profile on itsbiography.com
 Syed Samsam Bukhari/profile on profilesinfo.com
 Syed Samsam Bukhari/profile on urdupoint.com
 Syed Samsam Bukhari Wiki, Biography, Age, Career, Relationship, Net Worth & Know About Everything (wikitrusted.com)
 Syed Samsam Bukhari/profile on pakpedia

Living people
1965 births
Government College University, Lahore alumni
Pakistan People's Party politicians
Punjab MPAs 2018–2023
Pakistani MNAs 2008–2013